Doug Sauter (born 1954) is a Canadian former ice hockey coach.

Sauter was the head coach of the Oklahoma City Blazers of the Central Hockey League (CHL) from 1995 to 2009.
He was also the coach of the Wheeling Thunderbirds from 1992 until he departed Wheeling for Oklahoma City in 1995.

Sauter is a member of the Thunderbirds ( now Nailers) Hall of Fame. In 2013, Sauter was inducted into the CHL Hall of Fame.

Awards and honours

References

External links

Doug Sauter's profile at Eliteprospects.com

1954 births
Living people
Brandon Wheat Kings coaches
Calgary Wranglers coaches
Canadian ice hockey coaches
Medicine Hat Tigers coaches
Regina Pats coaches